Canal+ Caraïbes is a direct broadcasting satellite service serving the French Overseas Departments of the Caribbean, as well as French Guiana. The service was launched on 1 August 1998, under the name CanalSatellite Caraibes.  It is wholly owned by the Groupe Canal+, and is broadcast on Intelsat 903 at 34.5° West.

Channels
CanalSat Caraïbes had to change satellites to permit the launch of the New High Definition channels.

On 11 October 2008, CanalSat Caraïbes offered a "Freesat" Service, which only requires a viewing card and no subscription; it is very similar to the TNTSAT Service offered in France.

CanalSat Caraïbes launched a High Definition Service, 'l'option HD'. It originally composed of Disney Cinemagic HD, Canal+ HD and National Geographic HD. On 7 June additional Channels were launched, they were M6 HD and TF1 HD.  CanalSat Caraïbes hopes to launch more channels by the end of 2008.

Canal+ Haïti
Canalsat Haïti was launched in 2011. A local division was created in October 2015.

Canal+ Haïti have different packages. Many channels (like Canal+ and Ciné+ bouquets) and services (Disney+) are unavailable in the territory. Exclusive channels were launched for Haiti like Haïti Sport 1, Haïti Sport 2 and Trace Ayiti.

See also 
 Groupe Canal+
 Canal+ (French TV provider)
 Canal+ Afrique
 Canal+ Calédonie

References

External links 
Official Site

Direct broadcast satellite services
Television in France
Canal+